Jennifer Mariana Cesar Salazar (born 26 May 1989) is a Venezuelan road and track cyclist. She participated at the 2012 UCI Road World Championships, the 2015 Pan American Games, and the 2016 Summer Olympics.

Major results
Source: 

2013
 Bolivarian Games
1st  Omnium
1st  Team pursuit
2nd  Scratch
 3rd  Team pursuit, Pan American Track Championships
 3rd Time trial, National Road Championships
2014
 2nd  Road race, South American Games
 3rd  Team pursuit, Pan American Track Championships
2015
 National Road Championships
1st  Road race
1st  Time trial
 2nd Copa Federación Venezolana de Ciclismo
 5th Road race, Pan American Road Championships
 6th Clasico FVCiclismo Corre Por la VIDA
2016
 3rd Road race, National Road Championships
 5th Clasico FVCiclismo Corre Por la VIDA
2017
 National Road Championships
1st  Road race
3rd Time trial
 2nd  Team pursuit, Bolivarian Games
2018
 5th Road race, Central American and Caribbean Games
 8th Gran Premio Comite Olimpico Nacional Femenino
2022
 1st  Road race, South American Games

References

External links

1989 births
Venezuelan female cyclists
Living people
Place of birth missing (living people)
Cyclists at the 2015 Pan American Games
Cyclists at the 2016 Summer Olympics
Olympic cyclists of Venezuela
South American Games gold medalists for Venezuela
South American Games silver medalists for Venezuela
South American Games medalists in cycling
Competitors at the 2014 South American Games
Competitors at the 2022 South American Games
Pan American Games competitors for Venezuela
20th-century Venezuelan women
21st-century Venezuelan women